Self-Portrait (or Self-Portrait at Twenty-Eight) is a panel painting by the German Renaissance artist Albrecht Dürer. Painted early in 1500, just before his 29th birthday, it is the last of his three painted self-portraits. Art historians consider it the most personal, iconic and complex of his self-portraits.

The self-portrait is most remarkable because of its resemblance to many earlier representations of Christ. Art historians note the similarities with the conventions of religious painting, including its symmetry, dark tones and the manner in which the artist directly confronts the viewer and raises his hands to the middle of his chest as if in the act of blessing.

Description

Dürer's face has the inflexibility and impersonal dignity of a mask, hiding the restless turmoil of anguish and passion within. In its directness and apparent confrontation with the viewer, the self-portrait is unlike any that came before. It is half-length, frontal and highly symmetrical; its lack of a conventional background seemingly presents Dürer without regard to time or place. The placement of the inscriptions in the dark fields on either side of Dürer are presented as if floating in space, emphasizing that the portrait has a highly symbolic meaning. Its sombre mood is achieved through the use of brown tones set against the plain black background. The lightness of touch and tone seen in his earlier two self-portraits has been replaced by a far more introverted and complex representation.

In 1500, a frontal pose was exceptional for a secular portrait. In Italy the conventional fashion for profile portraits was coming to an end, but being replaced with the three-quarters view which had been the accepted pose in Northern Europe since about 1420, and which Dürer used in his earlier self-portraits.  Fully frontal poses remained unusual, although Hans Holbein painted several of Henry VIII of England and his queens, perhaps under instruction to use the pose.  Late medieval and Early Renaissance art had developed the more difficult three-quarters view, and artists were proud of their skill in using it; to viewers in 1500 and after, a frontal pose was associated with images from medieval religious art, and mostly above all images of Christ.

The self-portrait is of a markedly more mature Dürer than both the 1493 Strasbourg self-portrait and the 1498 self-portrait which he produced after his first visit to Italy; in both of these earlier paintings he had highlighted his fashionable hairstyle and clothing and played on his youthful good looks. Dürer turned 28 around 1500, the time of this work. In the medieval view of the stages of life, 28 marked the transition from youth to maturity. The portrait therefore commemorates a turning point in the artist's life and in the millennium: the year 1500, displayed in the centre of the upper left background field, is here celebrated as epochal. Moreover, the placing of the year 1500 above his signature initials, A.D., gives them an added meaning as an abbreviation of Anno Domini. The painting may have been created as part of a celebration of the saeculum by the circle of the Renaissance humanist scholar Conrad Celtes, which included Dürer.

Iconography

Dürer deliberately portrays himself in a manner that invokes depictions of Christ. Dürer likely believed that any Christian could be portrayed as imitating Christ. The Latin inscription, composed by Celtes' personal secretary, translates as: "I, Albrecht Dürer of Nuremberg portrayed myself in appropriate [or everlasting] colours aged twenty-eight years". A further interpretation holds that the work is an acknowledgement that his artistic talents are God-given. Art historian Joseph Koerner wrote that "to seeing the frontal likeness and inward curved left hand as echoes of, respectively, the "A" and nestled "D" of the monogram featured at the right ... nothing we see in a Dürer is not Dürer's, monogram or not."

Late Northern medieval painting often portrayed Christ looking directly at the viewer, especially when shown as Salvator Mundi. Typically he was shown with a short beard, moustache and brown parted hair. Dürer has rendered himself in this manner, and gives himself brown hair, despite his other self-portraits showing his hair as reddish-blond. The painting so closely follows the conventions of late medieval religious art that it was used as the basis for depictions of Christ in a woodcut by Sebald Beham of c. 1520. This was perhaps intended to be passed off as a print by Dürer from the start, and in later printings bears a very large Dürer monogram, though this appears to have been added to the block several decades later; it was accepted by most experts as a Dürer until the 19th century.  In the next century, the face was used for Christ again, in a Christ and the Woman Taken in Adultery of 1637 by Johann Georg Vischer.

Dürer presents himself in similar poses and expressions in both his 1498 Christ as Man of Sorrows and 1503 charcoal drawing Head of the Dead Christ. Both are believed to be self-portraits, although they are not named as such. However, artist historians believe that since they bear remarkable similarities to his known self-portraits – including prominent eyes, a narrow mouth with a full upper lip, and the shape of both the nose and indent between lip and nose – that Dürer intended to represent himself in these works.

Provenance

The portrait was likely donated or sold by Dürer to the Nuremberg city council. It was probably on continuous public display in Nuremberg from just before Dürer's death in 1528 until 1805, when it was sold to the Bavarian royal collection. It is now in the Alte Pinakothek in Munich, Germany.  Nuremberg had had a copy made a few years earlier, which replaced the original on display in the City Hall.

Dürer was highly conscious of his self-image, and painted two earlier self-portraits: one in 1493 now in the Musée du Louvre, and another in 1498, now in the Museo del Prado.  He also inserted self-portraits in other paintings, and made self-portrait drawings, although, he did not portray himself in any of his prints. At least twelve self-portrait images survive, as well as the lost gouache Dürer sent to Raphael c 1515.

Gallery

References

Sources

 Bailey, Martin. Dürer. London: Phaidon Press, 1995. 
 Bartrum, Giulia, Albrecht Dürer and his Legacy. London: British Museum Press, 2002, 
 Brion, Marcel. Dürer. London: Thames and Hudson, 1960.
 Campbell, Lorne. Renaissance Portraits, European Portrait-Painting in the 14th, 15th and 16th Centuries. Yale, 1990. 
 Hutchison, Jane Campbell. Albrecht Dürer: A Guide to Research. New York: Garland, 2000. 
 Koerner, Joseph Leo. The Moment of Self-Portraiture in German Renaissance Art. University of Chicago Press, 1996. 
 Schmidt, Sebastian. »dan sӳ machten dy vürtrefflichen künstner reich«. Zur ursprünglichen Bestimmung von Albrecht Dürers Selbstbildnis im Pelzrock, in Anzeiger des Germanischen Nationalmuseums, 2010, 65–82.
 Shiner, Larry. The Invention of Art: A Cultural History. Chicago: Chicago University Press, 2003. 
 Smith, Robert. Dürer as Christ?, in The Sixteenth Century Journal, Volume 6, No. 2, October 1975, 26–36. 
Strauss, Walter L. The Complete Engravings, Etchings and Drypoints of Albrecht Dürer. Dover Books, New York, 1972.
 von Fricks, Julian. "Albrecht Dürer the Elder with a Rosary". In: Van Eyck to Durer. Borchert, Till-Holger (ed). London: Thames & Hudson, 2011.

External links

1500 paintings
15th-century portraits
Collection of the Alte Pinakothek
Self-portraits by Albrecht Dürer